Liverpool Broadgreen was a parliamentary constituency centred on the Broadgreen suburb of Liverpool.  It returned one Member of Parliament (MP)  to the House of Commons of the Parliament of the United Kingdom.

The constituency was created for the 1983 general election, and abolished for the 1997 general election. When the seat was first contested, it was estimated by the BBC and ITN that had it been fought at the previous election in 1979 it would have returned a Conservative MP with majority of 565. However, despite the Conservatives winning the 1983 general election with a landslide majority and Labour's support falling for its 1979 level, Labour won Broadgreen with a majority of 3,800. Labour would go on to win the seat at every election when it was contested.

Boundaries 
The City of Liverpool wards of Broadgreen, Childwall, Kensington, Old Swan, and Tuebrook.

Members of Parliament

Elections

Elections in the 1980s 

 Both Crawshaw and Pine were official candidates of their respective local parties and both supported the Alliance between the Liberals and the SDP, however Crawshaw was given endorsement by both national parties.

Elections in the 1990s

References 

The Times guide to the House of Commons 1983 - 1992

Broadgreen
Parliamentary constituencies in North West England (historic)
Constituencies of the Parliament of the United Kingdom established in 1983
Constituencies of the Parliament of the United Kingdom disestablished in 1997